The interosseous cuneocuboid ligament consists of a series of fibrous bands that connect the central portion of the cuboid to the lateral surfaces of the cuneiform bones.

Foot
Ligaments